The Embassy of Armenia in Baghdad is the diplomatic mission of Armenia to Iraq. The chancery is located at Baghdad's International Zone (Green Zone).

Since November 2018 Mr. Hrachya Poladian is the Armenian Ambassador in Baghdad.

Bilateral relations 
Diplomatic relations between Armenia and the Republic of Iraq were established on February 12, 1992. In 2000 Armenia opened its embassy in Baghdad, and the Embassy of Iraq was opened in Yerevan in 2001.

Due to the war in 2003 Armenia and Iraq have interrupted the activities of their embassies. Armenia has reopened its embassy in Baghdad in October 2010. Iraqi Embassy in Yerevan resumed its activities in 2012.

See also 
 List of diplomatic missions of Armenia
 Armenia–Iraq relations

External links 
 The Website of the Embassy
 Ministry of Foreign affairs of Armenia

References 

Iraq
Armenia
Armenia–Iraq relations